Giuseppe Farina (4 July 1927 – 23 September 1995) was an Italian footballer who played as a defender. On 11 November 1956, he represented the Italy national football team on the occasion of a friendly match against Switzerland in a 1–1 away draw.

References

1927 births
1995 deaths
Italian footballers
Italy international footballers
Association football defenders
S.S. Chieti Calcio players
Udinese Calcio players
Torino F.C. players
U.C. Sampdoria players